James Francis Bolwell (27 August 1911 – 15 August 1993) was an Australian rules footballer who played with North Melbourne in the Victorian Football League (VFL).

Notes

External links 

1911 births
1993 deaths
Australian rules footballers from Victoria (Australia)
North Melbourne Football Club players
Brighton Football Club players
People from Horsham, Victoria